The 1913 New South Wales state election was held on 6 December 1913. This election was for all of the 90 seats in the 23rd New South Wales Legislative Assembly and it was conducted in single-member constituencies with a second ballot if a majority was not achieved on the first. The 22nd parliament of New South Wales was dissolved on 6 November 1913 by the Governor, Sir Gerald Strickland, on the advice of the Premier William Holman.

There was a redistribution in 1912 as a result of the removal of the Australian Capital Territory from the state New South Wales and population growth in the Sydney metropolitan area. Labor won 7 of the 12 second round ballots.

Key dates

Results

{{Australian elections/Title row
| table style			= float:right;clear:right;margin-left:1em;
	| title			= New South Wales state election, 6 December 1913
	| house			= Legislative Assembly
	| series		= New South Wales state election
	| back			= 1910
	| forward		= 1917
	| enrolled		= 1,037,999
	| total_votes	= 668,601
	| turnout %		= 68.24
	| turnout chg	= 0.81
	| informal		= 15,751
	| informal %	= 2.30
	| informal chg	= +0.50
}}

|}

Changing seats

See also
 Candidates of the 1913 New South Wales state election
 Members of the New South Wales Legislative Assembly, 1913–1917

Notes

References

Elections in New South Wales
New South Wales
1910s in New South Wales
New South Waes state election